The M77 is a short metropolitan route in Greater Johannesburg, South Africa. It connects Moroka in Soweto with Roodepoort via Dobsonville. For its entire route, it is named Elias Motsoaledi Road.

Route 
The M77 begins at a junction with the M68 in the Moroka section of Soweto.  It heads northwards for 10 kilometres, through Jabavu (where it meets the western terminus of the M79) and Dobsonville (where it meets the M72 and the western terminus of the M70), to exit Soweto and reach its end at a junction with the R41 in Roodepoort, in the suburb of Cresswell Park (south of the town centre).

References 

Streets and roads of Johannesburg
Metropolitan routes in Johannesburg